Oliveville is an unincorporated community in Nottoway County, Virginia, United States.

References

Unincorporated communities in Nottoway County, Virginia
Unincorporated communities in Virginia